Chronic leukemia is an increase of abnormal white blood cells. It differs from acute leukemia, and is categorized as myelogenous or lymphocytic.

Chronic leukemia may refer to:
 Chronic myelogenous leukemia
 Chronic lymphocytic leukemia
 Hairy cell leukemia

 
Leukemia